Locust Bottom, also known as Rollingwood Farm, is a historic home and national historic district located near Haymarket, Prince William County, Virginia. The main house was built about 1811, and is a two-story, four-bay, Federal style, brick dwelling with a single-pile, modified central-hall plan. It has end chimneys, a metal gable roof, a molded brick cornice, and a kitchen wing which predates the main house. The two-story rear frame addition was added in the late-19th century.  Also included in the district are the shop, the carriage house, the two chicken houses, the brooder house, the milk house, the horse barn, the tenant house, corn crib, and the remains of a smokehouse.

It was added to the National Register of Historic Places in 1989.

References

Houses on the National Register of Historic Places in Virginia
Historic districts on the National Register of Historic Places in Virginia
Federal architecture in Virginia
Houses completed in 1811
Houses in Prince William County, Virginia
National Register of Historic Places in Prince William County, Virginia